Yuya Kubo may refer to:

Yuya Kubo (baseball) (born 1980)
Yuya Kubo (footballer) (born 1993)